"Like Father, Like Son", also known as I learned it by watching you!, was a large-scale United States anti-narcotics campaign by Partnership for a Drug-Free America. Launched in July 1987, the campaign used a televised public service announcement.

The PSA features a father confronting his son (Reid MacLean) in his bedroom after finding a box containing an unspecified controlled substance and drug paraphernalia. After his father angrily asks him how he learned to use drugs, the son shouts, "You, alright?! I learned it by watching you!" As the father recoils from realizing the error of his own ways, a narrator then intones, "Parents who use drugs, have children who use drugs."

It was listed by Time as one of the top ten PSAs of all time.

See also
War on Drugs

References

External links
The original PSA as rebroadcast in I Love the 80s.
Official PDFA website

Public service announcements of the United States
American advertising slogans
Advertising campaigns
American television commercials
1980s television commercials
Drug policy of the United States
1987 in American television
1987 neologisms
Anti-drugs public service announcements